Busia Airport is an airport in Kenya.

Location
Busia Airport  is located in Busia County in the town of Busia, in southwestern Kenya, close to the International border with Uganda.

The geographic coordinates of this airport are:0° 27' 20.02"N, 34° 7' 48.00"E (Latitude:0.45560; Longitude:34.13000).

Overview
Busia Airport is a small civilian airport, serving the border town of Busia, Kenya and surrounding communities.

Airlines and destinations
There is no regular, scheduled airline service to Busia Airport at this time.

Accidents and incidents
On Friday, 24 January 2003, at about 1645 hours, local time, Gulfstream Aerospace G-159 (G-1) aircraft, owned and operated by African Commuter Services Limited (ACS), crashed on attempted initial takeoff climb from Busia Airport.

The aircraft which carried Kenyan Government officials, had originated from Nairobi and was destined for Kisumu. The aircraft carried three crew members and nine passengers. Two of the crew died, including the captain and one of the passengers, a cabinet minister (Ahmed Khalif, then Minister of Labor) also died. There was no fire but the aircraft was damaged beyond repair and was written off.

See also
 Kenya Airports Authority
 Kenya Civil Aviation Authority
 List of airports in Kenya

References

External links
  Location of Busia Airport At Google Maps
  Website of Kenya Airports Authority
 List of Airports In Kenya

Airports in Kenya
Busia County